The Dotty Mack Show is an American variety show originally broadcast on the now defunct DuMont Television Network in 1953, and on ABC from 1953 to 1956.

Broadcast history
The program, produced and distributed from Cincinnati, aired Monday at 10:45 pm on most DuMont affiliates until July 1953, when it moved to Tuesdays at 9:30 pm.

Originally titled Girl Alone, the program featured performer Dotty Mack lip synching and dancing to popular 1950s songs. The name of the program was changed to The Dotty Mack Show in the summer of 1953 when she was joined by male performers Colin Male (1925-1996) and Bob Braun (1929-2001). The last DuMont show was on August 25, 1953.

The series then moved to ABC, first on Saturdays at 8 pm, opposite The Mickey Rooney Show: Hey, Mulligan on NBC and The Jackie Gleason Show on CBS, and then Mondays at 9 pm on ABC, where it remained until being canceled in September 1956.

See also
List of programs broadcast by the DuMont Television Network
List of surviving DuMont Television Network broadcasts
Hit Parade - Australian series with similar format

References

Bibliography
David Weinstein, The Forgotten Network: DuMont and the Birth of American Television (Philadelphia: Temple University Press, 2004) 
Alex McNeil, Total Television, Fourth edition (New York: Penguin Books, 1980) 
Tim Brooks and Earle Marsh, The Complete Directory to Prime Time Network TV Shows, Third edition (New York: Ballantine Books, 1964)

External links

DuMont historical website

1953 American television series debuts
1956 American television series endings
1950s American variety television series
American Broadcasting Company original programming
Black-and-white American television shows
Dance television shows
DuMont Television Network original programming
English-language television shows
Pop music television series